Passarell is a surname. Notable people with the surname include:

Al Passarell (1950–1986), Canadian politician
Pit Passarell (born in 1968), Argentinian-born Brazilian musician

See Also
Process Passarell, desalination process
Pasarell